Coptotriche forsteroniae is a moth of the family Tischeriidae. It was described by Stonis and Diškus in 2008. It is found in Belize.

The larvae feed on Forsteronia myriantha. They mine the leaves of their host plant.

References

Moths described in 2008
Tischeriidae